These are the 1974 Five Nations Championship squads:

England

Head coach: John Elders

 Mike Burton
 Fran Cotton
 Peter Dixon
 David Duckham
 Geoff Evans
 Dusty Hare
 Nigel Horton
 Tony Jorden
 Tony Neary
 Alan Old
 John Pullin (c.)
 Chris Ralston
 Andy Ripley
 Peter Rossborough
 David Roughley
 Peter Squires
 Keith Smith
 Steve Smith
 Stack Stevens
 Roger Uttley
 Jan Webster

France

Head coach: Jean Desclaux

 Jean-Michel Aguirre
 Jean-Louis Azarete
 Max Barrau (c.)*
 René Benesis
 Jean-Louis Berot
 Roland Bertranne
 Victor Boffelli
 Elie Cester (c.)
 Claude Dourthe
 Michel Droitecourt
 André Dubertrand
 Alain Esteve
 Jacques Fouroux
 Jean-François Gourdon
 Jean Iracabal
 Daniel Kaczorowski
 Jean-Pierre Lux
 Joel Pecune
 Jean-Pierre Romeu
 Olivier Saisset
 Jean-Claude Skrela
 Claude Spanghero
 Armand Vaquerin

 captain in the first game

Ireland

Head coach: Syd Millar

 Patrick Agnew
 Vinny Becker
 Shay Deering
 Tony Ensor
 Mike Gibson
 Tom Grace
 Moss Keane
 Ken Kennedy
 Patrick Lavery
 Sean Lynch
 Willie John McBride (c.)
 Stewart McKinney
 Ray McLoughlin
 Arthur McMaster
 Richard Milliken
 John Moloney
 Terry Moore
 Michael Quinn
 Fergus Slattery

Scotland

Head coach: Bill Dickinson

 Ian Barnes
 Gordon Brown
 Sandy Carmichael
 Lewis Dick
 Drew Gill
 Michael Hunter
 Andy Irvine
 Alan Lawson
 Wilson Lauder
 Nairn MacEwan
 Duncan Madsen
 Ian McGeechan
 Alastair McHarg
 Ian McLauchlan (c.)
 Dougie Morgan
 Jim Renwick
 Colin Telfer
 Bill Watson

Wales

Head coach: Clive Rowlands

 Phil Bennett
 Roy Bergiers
 Roger Blyth
 Terry Cobner
 Gerald Davies
 Mervyn Davies
 Gareth Edwards (c.)
 Alex Finlayson
 Ian Hall
 Keith Hughes
 Phil Llewellyn
 Allan Martin
 Dai Morris
 Derek Quinnell
 Clive Rees
 Ian Robinson
 Glyn Shaw
 Delme Thomas
 Geoff Wheel
 J. J. Williams
 J. P. R. Williams
 Walter Williams
 Bobby Windsor

External links
1974 Five Nations Championship at ESPN

Six Nations Championship squads